Otonoma is a genus of moth in the family Cosmopterigidae.

Species
Otonoma anemois Meyrick, 1897
Otonoma leucochlaena Meyrick, 1919
Otonoma sophronica Meyrick, 1920
Otonoma sphenosema (Meyrick, 1897)

References
Natural History Museum Lepidoptera genus database

Cosmopteriginae